Samsung Galaxy J7 is a mid range Android smartphone produced by Samsung Electronics in 2015.

In Latin America, Galaxy J7 (SM-J700M) was being sold alongside the Galaxy S5 Neo (SM-G903M), which shares same Exynos 7580 Octa SoC.

Specifications

Hardware
The phone has versions with 1.5 GB of  RAM and 16GB internal storage that can be expanded with a MicroSD card up to 128GB. It has 13-megapixel primary camera and  5-megapixel front camera with LED flash. It has a 5.5 inches HD (720x1280 pixels) Super AMOLED capacitive touchscreen.

SoCQualcomm model: Snapdragon 615SM-J700F / H / M models: Exynos 7580South Korea KT model (SM-J700K): Snapdragon 410USA CDMA model (SM-J700P): Snapdragon 415

CPUQualcomm model: 4x ARM Cortex-A53 1.7 GHz + 4x ARM Cortex-A53 1.1 GHz SM-J700F / H / M models: Octa-core ARM Cortex-A53 1.5 GHzSouth Korea KT model (SM-J700K): 4x ARM Cortex-A53 1.2 GHz USA CDMA model (SM-J700P): Octa-core ARM-Cortex A53 1.4 GHz

GPUQualcomm model: Adreno 405 SM-J700F / H / M models: Mali-T720MP2South Korea KT model (SM-J700K): Adreno 306USA CDMA model (SM-J700P): Adreno 405
Unlimɛted Space

Software 
This phone is officially released with Android 5.1.1 Lollipop. Android 6.0.1 Marshmallow update was made available for SM-J700F on 28 July 2016 in India. Android 6.0.1 Marshmallow update is also available for J700H and M in Pakistan and Panama. Android 7.1 Nougat was released for the models that came Android 6.0.1 Marshmallow pre-installed.

See also

 Samsung Galaxy J
 Samsung Galaxy J5
 Samsung Galaxy
 Samsung
 Android (operating system)

References

Galaxy Core
Galaxy Core
Samsung smartphones
Android (operating system) devices
Mobile phones introduced in 2015
Discontinued smartphones
Mobile phones with user-replaceable battery